The 2017 Omloop Het Nieuwsblad was a road cycling one-day race that took place on 25 February 2017. It was the 72nd edition of the Omloop Het Nieuwsblad and was the fourth event of the 2017 UCI World Tour. It was the first time that the race was included in the UCI World Tour calendar.

The race was won, from a three-up sprint finish, by Greg Van Avermaet, ahead of the reigning world champion Peter Sagan – riding for  – and 's Sep Vanmarcke completed the podium, after the three riders broke away from the field in the final quarter of the race.

Teams
As a new event to the UCI World Tour, all UCI WorldTeams were invited to the race, but not obligated to compete in the race. As such, fifteen of the eighteen WorldTeams – all except ,  and  – competed in the race. Ten UCI Professional Continental teams competed, completing the 25-team peloton.

Route
After a forced relocation from Sint-Pietersplein to the  – the site adjacent to the Kuipke velodrome – for the 2016 Omloop Het Nieuwsblad, the Citadel Park again hosted the start of the race. The finish was once again held on the Emile Claus thoroughfare, close to the starting place.

At  and with thirteen climbs in the hill zone, the course was challenging and arduous. Additionally, there were several flat stretches of cobbles. After a year's hiatus due to roadworks, the Molenberg returned to the race for its 2017 edition; the Eikenberg was also partially paved for the 2017 race.

Categorised climbs and cobbles

Result

References

External links
 

2017 UCI World Tour
2017 in Belgian sport
2017
February 2017 sports events in Europe